Charles Nicholas Bawden (born June 22, 1996) is an American football fullback for the New York Jets of the National Football League (NFL). He played college football at San Diego State.

College career
Bawden began his collegiate career as a quarterback at San Diego State. During his freshman season, he started two games for the Aztecs, completing 13 of 38 passes for 147 yards with a touchdown and two interceptions, he then switched to the fullback position after the season. He caught 15 passes for 137 yards as a junior, and 15 for 103 yards and his first touchdown as a senior.

In back to back years, Bawden was the lead blocker for two different 2,000 yard rushers in Donnel Pumphrey and Rashaad Penny. This was the first time this had been done in the history of college football. Both of those running backs were also the leading rushers in college football in 2016 and 2017.

Professional career

Detroit Lions
Bawden was drafted by the Detroit Lions in the seventh round (237th overall) of the 2018 NFL Draft. On June 6, 2018, it was reported that Bawden suffered a torn ACL in OTAs and was ruled out for the 2018 season. He was placed on injured reserve on July 24, 2018.

On November 20, 2019, Bawden was placed on injured reserve.

On August 31, 2020, Bawden was placed on injured reserve with a knee injury. He was waived on June 3, 2021.

New York Jets
On September 23, 2021, Bawden signed with the New York Jets' practice squad. He was promoted to the active roster on November 24, 2021.

On March 13, 2022, Bawden was re-signed by the Jets. He was placed on injured reserve on August 30, 2022.

References

External links
Detroit Lions bio
San Diego State Aztecs bio

1996 births
Living people
American football fullbacks
Detroit Lions players
New York Jets players
People from Los Gatos, California
Players of American football from California
San Diego State Aztecs football players
Sportspeople from Santa Clara County, California